York was a mining settlement in the U.S. state of Alaska during the late 19th- and early 20th-century. 

In the spring of 1900, York promised to be a place of importance and a post office was established in April, but in the early fall, its population had been reduced to about 20–30. The settlement included a number of log cabins and half a dozen substantial frame buildings. It was a distributing point for the region to the north, but during the stormy months of the fall, landing at York was difficult. The post office was closed in 1902 and the settlement's entire population died during the influenze epidemic of 1918 after the disease reached Wales from York where it killed 170 of the town's 310 residents.

References
 
 

Former populated places in Alaska
Mining communities in Alaska
Populated places in Nome Census Area, Alaska
Ghost towns in Alaska
Ghost towns in the United States
Ghost towns in North America